Hisonotus charrua is a species of catfish in the family Loricariidae. It is native to South America, where it occurs in the Uruguay River and the mouth of the Río de la Plata in Uruguay. The species may be found in both freshwater and brackish environments and reaches 3.6 cm (1.4 inches) SL.

References 

Otothyrinae
Fish described in 2006
Fish of South America